The 1988 Idaho Vandals football team represented the University of Idaho in the 1988 NCAA Division I-AA football season. The Vandals, led by third-year head coach Keith Gilbertson, were members of the Big Sky Conference and played their home games at the Kibbie Dome, an indoor facility on campus in Moscow, Idaho.

The Vandals won their third conference title in four seasons, and made the I-AA playoffs for the fourth consecutive season.

The shortened regular season was beneficial in 1988, as the Vandals played three post-season games, falling on the road in the national semifinals in Gilbertson's final game as the Vandals' head coach. He left for an assistant's position  in the Pac-10 in Seattle, as offensive line coach under head coach

Notable games
Following a sole loss on the road to conference rival Montana, Idaho won its final seven games of the regular season. The Vandals defeated Nevada for a second consecutive year, only the third time in the eleven meetings since the Wolf Pack joined the Big Sky in 1979. The Vandals defeated rival Boise State for the seventh consecutive year, the seventh of twelve straight over the Broncos. Idaho entered the post-season with the top ranking in Division I-AA.

Division I-AA playoffs
For the fourth consecutive season, Idaho returned to the I-AA playoffs. In the first round, the Vandals hosted conference foe Montana, who had handed the Vandals their only defeat.  The Vandals won the rematch  at the Kibbie Dome two days after Thanksgiving. Idaho also hosted in the quarterfinals, and defeated  (La.)  but lost quarterback John Friesz with an ankle sprain in the third quarter.

In the semifinals Idaho was eliminated  on the road at Furman in Greenville, South Carolina, ending the Vandals' season at   With their third-string quarterback and many other reserves playing against the top-ranked defense in Division I-AA, the Vandals were only down  at the half, but the score mounted to  before the Vandals scored.  The Vandal defense gave up 320 rushing yards to the Paladins. Furman went on to win the I-AA title the following week.

Notable players
The 1988 team included three future NFL players with lengthy pro careers: defensive end Marvin Washington, guard Mark Schlereth, and junior John Friesz, the future collegiate hall of fame quarterback was a three-year starter (1987–89).  Washington was on a basketball scholarship and this was his only season of Vandal football.

Schedule

Roster

All-conference

Quarterback John Friesz and tackle Greg Hale returned to the all-conference team as unanimous selections. Also on the first team were wide receiver John Jake, center Steve Unger, defensive end Marvin Washington, and safety Brian Smith. Vandals on the second team were tackle Todd Neu, guard Mark Schlereth, cornerback Richard Carey, and linebackers Roger Cecil and Jerry Medved. Honorable mention were wide receiver Lee Allen, guard Troy Wright, running back Bruce Harris, placekicker Thayne Doyle, and defensive linemen Kord Smith, Jim Routos, and Mike Zeller.

Friesz repeated as the Big Sky's outstanding offensive player, and was a first-team Kodak All-American in

NFL Draft
Two Vandal seniors were selected in the 1989 NFL Draft, which lasted twelve rounds (335 selections).

One Vandal junior was selected in the following year's draft in 1990, also twelve rounds (332 selections).

List of Idaho Vandals in the NFL Draft

References

External links
Gem of the Mountains: 1989 University of Idaho yearbook – 1988 football season
Idaho Argonaut – student newspaper – 1988 editions

Idaho
Idaho Vandals football seasons
Big Sky Conference football champion seasons
Idaho Vandals football